Pate's Grammar School is a grammar school with academy status in Cheltenham, Gloucestershire, England. It caters for pupils aged 11 to 18. The school was founded with a fund bestowed to Corpus Christi College, Oxford, by Richard Pate in 1574. The school became co-educational in 1986, when Pate's Grammar School for Girls merged with Cheltenham Grammar School.

Pate's has been awarded 'State Secondary School of the Year’ twice by The Sunday Times in their Good Schools Guide in 2012 and 2020. In 2013, the school was given an Outstanding judgement by Ofsted.

Academic achievements
At GCSE level in 2004, 100% of pupils entered earned five A* to C grades, and the school came twelfth in the BBC table of performance in A-/AS-Level. Again in 2005, 100% of pupils earned five A* to C grades at GCSE, and in 2006, 100% of pupils passed in at least seven subjects with grades A* to C. In 2008, more A* grades were achieved collectively than any other grade put together at GCSE level.

The physics department was recognised as the best in the country in a survey published by The Observer in May 2006.

In 2012 Pate's achieved the fourth best state secondary school results in the United Kingdom. It was also awarded with 'State Secondary School of the Year’. In 2019 the school was ranked as one of the top secondary state schools in the UK with 95.6% of grades at A*-B at A-level and 87.5% of grades at 9-7 at GCSE.

Sporting achievements
The senior rugby team was coached by ex-England scrum-half Peter Kingston until his retirement in 2009.
In 2007 Pate's senior rugby teams completed a season unbeaten for the first time in 21 years.

The Old Patesians club has grounds and a clubhouse in Leckhampton, which was built when their previous premises were demolished to make way for Cheltenham's tallest building, Eagle Tower.

Community

The school competes in the Young Enterprise competition held amongst schools nationwide. The school was also named as one of the four winners of the annual BBC School's Question Time competition in 2009. During the 1970s the school were winners of the BBC radio show Top of the Form.

Pate's is also involved with charity work and has a Charity Committee appointed each year; in 2007–2008, over £16,000 was raised. The school is situated in a deprived area of Cheltenham and under the headmaster Richard Kemp deprived students were encouraged to apply.

The current headmaster is Russel Ellicott, who took over from Shaun Fenton in September 2012.

Developments
The boys' school was established in 1586. The Gothic premises in the High Street were demolished in 1967 to make way for a concrete supermarket, at a time when many other historic buildings, which would now be listed and protected, were also lost. The school playing field existed quite remote from the school in Hesters Way, and a replacement school was built there, after the boundaries had been altered to make way for the Princess Elizabeth Way and Coronation Square council developments. The majority of pupils lived in more affluent areas on the opposite side of the town and needed to commute by public transport. The building was designed by architects, but its appearance was not popular, it had various impractical features, and developed structural problems. It was demolished in the 1990s and replaced by an adjacent new building. During this period the school somehow lost its nomenclature with Richard Pate, and his name instead became associated with the girls' school at Pittville.

The school raised funds in order to complete new fitness facilities. The £50,000 fitness suite was opened by Geoff Hurst in April 2010.

In summer 2012, Pate's Grammar completed the construction of a new refectory, costing £1.75 million. This also involved upgrading the school canteen to a cashless catering system operated by sQuid. It was opened by the Duke of Gloucester on 5 October 2012. Plans have been announced for a new sixth form block to be built and completed summer 2019.

In 2013, a new school block was opened named 'The George and Eve Tatam Block', after alumni who also sponsor higher level study at the Corpus Christi College of both Oxford and Cambridge.

In spring 2019, a new sixth form block opened following a grant received in 2017. The three-storey building comprises study spaces and IT facilities on the lower two floors, whilst the upper floor houses the senior library. The building links directly to the George and Eve Tatum Block next to which it is constructed.

Former headmasters and headmistresses

Pate's Grammar School
 2012–Present: Russel Ellicott
 2006–2012: Shaun Fenton
 2000–2006: Richard Kemp
 1986–1999: David J. Barnes

Cheltenham Grammar School
 1983–1986: P.J. Bamford
 1971–1983: Bernard Wilkinson
 1952–1971: Arthur E. Bell
 1937–1952: Geoffrey Heawood
 1918–1937: R.R. Dobson
 1882–1906: John Style (husband of Mary Watson)
 1868–1882: Henry Martyn Jeffery
 1859–1868: Henry Hayman
 1852–1859: Edward Rupert Humphreys

Pate's Grammar School for Girls
 1982–1986: J. Whiting (Acting Head)
 1971–1982: Mary M. Moon
 1970-1971: Jean O Huddlestone (Acting Head)
 1952–1970: Margaret E. Lambrick
 1946–1952: Dame Margaret Miles
 1934–1946: Muriel Jennings
 1911–1934: Anita N. Miles
 1905–1911: Helen Headley

Notable former pupils

Pate's Grammar School
 Ben Chacko, editor since 2014 of the Morning Star
 Siân Berry, Member of the London Assembly and former leader of the Green Party of England and Wales
 Matt Smith, professional footballer 
 Sue Limb, novelist

Cheltenham Grammar School

Music 

 Gustav Holst, composer
 Brian Jones, musician and founder of The Rolling Stones
 Philip Lane, composer

Sport 

 Gilbert Jessop, cricketer
 Robert Lanchbury , Gloucestershire cricketer
 Alfred Payne, cricketer

Engineers 

 Sir Benjamin Baker, engineer of the Forth Bridge
 Sir Frederick Handley Page, founder of the aircraft company Handley Page
 Gordon Lewis, aeronautical engineer, and designer of the Olympus and Pegasus engines with Bristol Siddeley
 Bob Parkinson, rocket engineer with British Aerospace, worked on HOTOL

Academia 

 William Henry Corfield, revolutionised hygiene and household sanitation in Victorian England.
 Sir Rowland Biffen, developed disease resistant wheat strains
 H. J. Round, scientist, played an important part in the discovery of light-emitting diodes
 Martin Hume Johnson, Professor of Reproductive Sciences from 1992-2012 at the University of Cambridge (Christ's College)
 Piers Coleman, theoretical physicist, Professor of Physics Rutgers University and brother of Jaz Coleman.
 Anthony Howe, professor of modern history since 2003 at UEA
 Kit Fine, philosopher

Politics 

 Adrian Bailey, Labour MP from 2000-2019 for West Bromwich West.
 John Roberts, Liberal MP from 1885–1906 for South Caernarfonshire, Eifion

Film & TV 

 John Ringham, character actor
 Rex Tucker, TV director
 Desmond Wilcox, TV reporter, late husband of Dame Esther Rantzen

Authors 

 Robert Hawker, poet
 Geoff Dyer, writer

Other 
 Colonel John Chard, British Army officer; received the Victoria Cross (VC) for his service in January 1879 at Rorke's Drift
 Peter Lampl, founder of the Sutton Trust
 Sir Edgar Vaughan, ambassador from 1960 to 1963 to Panama
 Ernest Blackie, Bishop of Grimsby from 1935 to 1937
 The Baron Christopher, general secretary from 1976 to 1988 of the Inland Revenue Staff Federation
 John Clink, Flag Officer Sea Training since 2015

Pate's Grammar School for Girls
 Mary Honeyball, Labour MEP 2000 - 2019 for London
 Dame Felicity Lott, soprano
 Dame Lesley Rees, endocrinologist, professor of chemical endocrinology since 1978 at Barts and The London School of Medicine and Dentistry
 Fiona Sampson, poet, professor of poetry since 2013 at the University of Roehampton
 Anne Warner, professor of developmental biology at UCL, and director from 1999-2006 of UCL's Centre for Mathematics and Physics in the Life Sciences and Experimental Biology

See also
 Old Patesians RFC

References

External links
 Pate's Grammar School, official site
 Pate's Grammar School OED (Outdoor Education Department), official OED site
 Pate's Grammar School CCF (Combined Cadet Force), official CCF site

Schools in Cheltenham
Grammar schools in Gloucestershire
Educational institutions established in the 1570s
1574 establishments in England
Academies in Gloucestershire